An operational system is a term used in data warehousing to refer to a system that is used to process the day-to-day transactions of an organization. These systems are designed in a manner that processing of day-to-day transactions is performed efficiently and the integrity of the transactional data is preserved.

Synonyms 
Sometimes operational systems are referred to as operational databases, transaction processing systems, or online transaction processing systems (OLTP). However, the use of the last two terms as synonyms may be confusing, because operational systems can be batch processing systems as well.

Any enterprise must necessarily maintain a lot of data about its operation.

See also
 Operating system (OS)
 Data warehouses versus operational systems

Data warehousing
Data management
Business intelligence